Cicindela togata, Laurentian tiger beetle is a species of tiger beetle in the Cicindelinae subfamily that can be found in Minnesota, Manitoba, and Ontario. It can be found in gravel and sand as well as coniferous forests where it preys on other insect species. When it comes to hunting, adults are either wait for their prey in an ambush or chase it. It larvae usually digs burrows in which they wait for their victim to come by. Once an unsuspected arthropod is in site, it opens it jaws and eats it.

References

denikei
Beetles of North America